The Lee & Rose Warner Coliseum is an indoor arena in Falcon Heights, Minnesota, United States.  It hosted the Professional Indoor Football League's Minnesota Monsters, and hosts North Star Roller Derby.  The arena holds 5,785 people.  Built on the grounds of the Minnesota State Fair, it also hosts indoor events of the fair as well as high school ice hockey tournaments.  The Coliseum was opened in 1951, it replaced the original Hippodrome that was used until 1942.

References 

Buildings and structures in Ramsey County, Minnesota
Indoor arenas in Minnesota
Indoor ice hockey venues in Minneapolis–Saint Paul
Sports venues completed in 1951
1951 establishments in Minnesota
Minnesota State Fair